Ćeralije is a village in Croatia, in the municipality of Voćin, Virovitica-Podravina County. It is connected by the D69 highway.

Demographics
According to the 2011 census, the village of Ćeralije has 623 inhabitants. This represents 219.37% of its pre-war population according to the 1991 census.

The 1991 census recorded that 91.55% of the village population were ethnic Serbs (260/284), 4.93% were ethnic Croats (14/284), 1.76% were Yugoslavs (5/284) and 1.76% were of other ethnic origin (5/284).

After 1995, Janjevci Croats from Kosovo were settled in Ćeralije.

References

Populated places in Virovitica-Podravina County
Serb communities in Croatia